Preah Netr Preah is a khum (commune) of Preah Netr Preah District in Banteay Meanchey Province in north-western Cambodia.

Villages

 Preah Paoy Kdoeang
 Cheung Voat
 Kandal
 Post Chas
 Paoy Samraong
 Paoy Pring
 Ta Paen
 Sreh Kaeut
 Sreh Lech
 Kouk Srok
 Sramaoch
 Peam Sreh
 Doun Chaeng
 Kon Damrey

References

Communes of Banteay Meanchey province
Preah Netr Preah District